The Schempp-Hirth Arcus is a flapped Two Seater Class glider in production by Schempp-Hirth.  It first flew 7 April 2009.  It is offered in addition to the Duo Discus which is an unflapped 20 metre two-seater, whose fuselage it shares. The wings have flaperons integrated along the whole span.

It is available as a pure glider, a turbo using the Solo 2350-engine, and as a self-launching glider using the Solo 2625-02i. An electric power unit based on Antares 20E equipment was produced until end 2016 when cooperation with Lange stopped.

Variants
Arcus
Production variant with a 20 m wingspan.
Arcus T
Production variant with self-sustaining capabilities, using the Solo 2350 engine.
Arcus M
Production variant with self-launching capabilities, using the Solo 2625-02i engine.
Arcus E
Production variant with self-launching capabilities, using the EM42 electric motor.

Specifications

See also

References

External links

Schempp-Hirth
Photo gallery

2000s German sailplanes
Arcus
Motor gliders
T-tail aircraft
Aircraft first flown in 2009